Accoella is a genus of beetles in the family Carabidae, containing the following species:

 Accoella akirai Ueno, 1990
 Accoella thermalis Ueno, 1995

References

Trechinae